Cadwell Turnbull is an American science fiction and fantasy writer from the U.S. Virgin Islands. He is the author of award-winning short stories and novels, including The Lesson (2019) and No Gods, No Monsters (2021).

Biography 
Turnbull was raised in St. Thomas, U.S. Virgin Islands. He moved to Pittsburgh to attend La Roche University, where he received a BA in Professional Writing. He attended North Carolina State University for graduate school, where he studied under John Kessel and Wilton Barnhardt. He received an MFA in Creative Writing (Fiction) and an MA in English (Linguistics). He is a graduate of the Clarion West Writers Workshop, which he attended in 2016. He is an Assistant Professor of Creative Writing at North Carolina State University.

Works 
Turnbull's short stories have appeared in Asimov’s Science Fiction, Lightspeed Magazine, and Nightmare Magazine. Two of his short stories have been read by LeVar Burton on the LeVar Burton Reads podcast. His short story"Loneliness Is in Your Blood" was selected for The Best American Science Fiction and Fantasy 2018 anthology, and his short story "Jump" was selected for The Year's Best Science Fiction and Fantasy 2019 anthology.

His debut novel, The Lesson, was nominated for multiple awards and won the Neukom Institute Literary Arts Award for speculative fiction in the "debut" category. His second novel, No Gods, No Monsters, was listed as one of the best books of 2021 by The New York Times, NPR, Audible, the New York Public Library, Kirkus, Library Journal, and Tor.com.

Many of his stories take place (at least partially) in his native U.S. Virgin Islands. His writing often addresses sociopolitical topics like colonialism and post-colonialism, marginalized communities, climate change, police violence, and collective ownership. He credits Ursula Le Guin as influential to his writing along with Octavia Butler, Ted Chiang, N. K. Jemisin, Alice Munro, and George Orwell.

Bibliography

Novels 

 The Lesson. (2019). Blackstone Publishing. .
 No Gods, No Monsters. (2021). Blackstone Publishing. .

Short fiction 

 "Loneliness Is in Your Blood". (2017). Nightmare Magazine.
 "A Third of the Stars of Heaven". (2017). Lightspeed Magazine.
 “Other Worlds and This One”. (2017). Lightspeed Magazine.
 Reprinted (2018) in Asimov’s Science Fiction 
 “When the Rains Come Back.” (2017). Lightspeed Magazine.
 -- (2019). Featured on We Will Remember Freedom podcast.
 "They Built a Wall". (2018). Grassroots Economic Organizing.
 "Jump". (2019). Lightspeed Magazine.
 -- (2019). Featured on LeVar Burton Reads podcast.
 "Monsters Come Howling in their Season". (2019). The Verge.
 "All the Hidden Places". (2019). Nightmare Magazine.
 "The Letters Triptych". (2020). In The Dystopia Triptych: Ignorance is Strength, Vol 1. Broach Reach Publishing and Adamant Press. .
 "Mediation." (2020). In Entanglements: Tomorrow's Lovers, Families, and Friends. MIT Press. .
 "Shock of Birth". (2021). Lightspeed Magazine.
 -- (2021). Featured on LeVar Burton Reads podcast.
 "Killmonger Rising". (2021). In Black Panther: Tales of Wakanda. Titan Books. .

Awards

References

External links 

 Official website

Year of birth missing (living people)
Living people